Sergio Caprari (12 July 1932 – 12 October 2015) was an Italian boxer who won the silver medal in the featherweight division at the 1952 Summer Olympics in Helsinki.

Caprari was born in Civitacastellana in 1932.  He died in 2015.

Olympic results 
Below are the results of Sergio Caprari, an Italian featherweight boxer who competed at the 1952 Helsinki Olympics:

Round of 32: bye
Round of 16: Defeated Pentti Niinivuori (Finland) by decision, 2–1
Quarterfinal: Defeated Leszek Drogosz (Poland) by decision, 3–0
Semifinal: Defeated Joseph Ventaja (France) by decision, 2–1
Final: Lost to Ján Zachara (Czechoslovakia) by decision, 1–2 (was awarded silver medal)

References

External links
Olympic DB

1932 births
Featherweight boxers
Boxers at the 1952 Summer Olympics
Olympic boxers of Italy
Olympic silver medalists for Italy
2015 deaths
Olympic medalists in boxing
Italian male boxers
Medalists at the 1952 Summer Olympics